Movistar Arena is a 17,000-seat multi-purpose indoor arena in Santiago, Chile. It is located inside O'Higgins Park, in downtown Santiago. Its main structure was built in 1956, but it remained unfinished and without roof, the roof was installed in 2000.

Buyer Peter Hiller opened it on April 15, 2006 as Arena Santiago with a seat-capacity of 12,000. Telefónica's cell phone division Movistar bought the stadium's naming rights, changing its name on October 6, 2008, while also expanding its capacity by 5,000 seats. It is one of the largest multi-purpose arenas in South America, with a total surface is 44,000 m². An additional 3,000 seats can be placed over the court during concerts, boosting the total capacity to 17,000 seats.

History 

The original building was designed and conceived by Mario Recordón in 1956 with the name "Metropolitan Indoor Stadium" to be the seat of the World Basketball Championship. However, funding was redirected to remodeling the Estadio Nacional de Chile, with a view to achieving the 1962 FIFA World Cup. The roofed stadium was left in total neglect.

In 1998, during the term of Eduardo Frei Ruiz-Tagle it was decided to complete it. The work was financed by Hiller Investments, which received a grant from the Ministry of Public Works with a 20-year lease.

Arena Santiago was symbolically opened on March 7, 2006 by then President Ricardo Lagos, and it was inaugurated on April 15 that year by his successor, Michelle Bachelet.

In 2008, managers signed a contract with portable phone company Movistar Chile for 16 years.

On 13 March 2018, Pearl Jam gave a concert to 17.000 people, setting a new attendance record at the venue.

On 5 November 2018, Robbie Williams performed on the arena as part of The Heavy Entertainment Show Tour.

Iron Maiden played their first ever arena show in Chile on 14 October 2019, as part of their Legacy of the Beast World Tour. The show was announced because the first concert at the Estadio Nacional on October 15 sold out all the 63,000 tickets half a year before the show.

Europe played in Movistar Arena on September 27, 2019 as part of their world tour called Walk The Earth Tour. 

It will be used as one of the venues for the 2023 Pan American Games and will host basketball events.

Davis Cup incident 
On 7 April 2000, the site served as the location of a Chile-Argentina Davis Cup rubber. During the second singles match between Nicolás Massú and Mariano Zabaleta, the crowd became violent, throwing fruit, coins and plastic chairs at the Argentine team. As a result, the Chilean Tennis Federation was fined nearly US$50,000 and was prohibited from hosting Davis Cup games for two years.

References

External links 

  (in Spanish)

Indoor arenas in Chile
Music venues in Chile
Sports venues in Santiago
Basketball venues in Chile
2006 establishments in Chile
Sports venues completed in 2006